Miroslav Đukić (born 19 February 1966)  is a Serbian former footballer who played as a sweeper, and a manager.

He spent 14 years of his professional career in Spain, notably at the service of Deportivo de La Coruña and Valencia, amassing La Liga totals of 368 games and 11 goals and winning a combined six major titles for the two teams.

Đukić represented FR Yugoslavia in one World Cup and one European Championship. After retiring, he embarked in a managerial career at both club and international level.

Playing career

Club
Born in Šabac, Socialist Republic of Serbia, Socialist Federal Republic of Yugoslavia, Đukić began his playing career with FK Mačva Šabac, moving in 1988 to Belgrade with FK Rad after reported interest from both national giants FK Partizan and Red Star Belgrade.

In the middle of 1990, Đukić signed for Deportivo de La Coruña in Spain, who purchased him for 40 million pesetas in 1990. He only appeared in five league games for the Galicians in his first season, which ended in La Liga promotion, but, from there onwards, became an undisputed starter, never totalling less than 35 matches and 3,000 minutes of action in five consecutive campaigns, as Super Depor was coming to fruition.

On 14 May 1994, in the league's last round, at home against Valencia CF, Đukić missed a penalty kick in the game's last minute (eventual 0–0 draw), as habitual taker Donato had already been replaced and second option Bebeto refused the responsibility since he failed to score one the previous match. As a result, FC Barcelona were crowned champions instead, and the elegant defender left A Coruña at the end of 1996–97 at the age of 31 as his contract was not renewed.

Subsequently, Đukić joined Valencia, starting in all of the league games he took part in his first three seasons and helping the Che to two consecutive UEFA Champions League finals, both lost. Already as a backup, he made 16 appearances as the club won the first national championship in 31 years in 2002.

Đukić returned to Segunda División after 12 years for the last season of his career, playing for CD Tenerife and retiring at the age of 38, having appeared in exactly 400 matches in the Spanish league (both major levels combined).

International
Đukić made his debut for Yugoslavia on 27 February 1991, in a 1–1 friendly draw against Turkey in İzmir. He went on to win 48 caps scoring twice, and represented the newly formed FR Yugoslavia at UEFA Euro 2000 (all the games and minutes for the quarter-finalists).

Đukić was also a member of the squad that competed at the 1998 FIFA World Cup, but did not play due to injury.

Coaching career

Club
On 23 January 2007, Đukić was named head coach of Partizan, being eventually voted Manager of the Year. On 11 June 2009 he signed for R.E. Mouscron in Belgium, replacing Enzo Scifo and being joined at the Pro League team by former Valencia teammates Amedeo Carboni and Juan Sánchez, who acted as sporting director and technical director, respectively; all left shortly after, as the club folded due to severe economical problems.

In late March 2011, Đukić became Hércules CF manager after Esteban Vigo was sacked. His first match in charge was a 3–1 away win against Real Sociedad, but the Valencians ultimately suffered top-flight relegation.

On 6 July 2011, Đukić was appointed at another second division side, agreeing to a three-year contract with Real Valladolid. In early June 2013, after leading them to promotion in his first season – via the playoffs – and the 14th position in the second, he replaced Ernesto Valverde at the helm of former club Valencia.

Đukić was relieved of his duties on 16 December 2013, following the team's eighth loss of the season, 3–0 at Atlético Madrid which left it in ninth place. He was revealed as the new Córdoba CF manager on 20 October 2014, succeeding Albert Ferrer.

On 23 January 2017, Đukić became the head coach of Al Shabab, but was forced out after the club merged with Al Ahli to form Shabab Al Ahli.

In June 2017, Đukić returned to Partizan after replacing Videoton FC-bound Marko Nikolić. During his second spell at the Partizan Stadium he made several controversial statements, starting in March 2018 when he used profanities at a press conference, saying that he "was born in fucking Štitar and not sunny Valencia" and that he was "a bum like all of you here." In May, he said "if Marko Janković manages to overcome the Montenegrin in him, he will be a great player"; in July, he referred to the team of FK Trakai as not being "some Indians with feathers."

Đukić came back to the Spanish second tier on 22 December 2019, taking the helm of Sporting de Gijón. Following a 13th-place finish, he was replaced by David Gallego the following July.

International
Đukić earned his coaching license in Spain, and started his new career with Serbia's under-21 team, which he led to the final of the 2007 UEFA European Championship, lost against hosts Netherlands. This arrived after a dramatic play-off qualification (3–0 home loss against Sweden, followed by a 5–0 away win).

On 19 December 2007, Đukić decided not to extend his expired contract with Partizan and was appointed coach of Serbia, leaving the position on 19 August of the following year without having played any official games, due to various problems with the Football Association.

Career statistics

International

Note: Yugoslavia was banned from international football in 1993. In 1994, FR Yugoslavia became the successor of the SFR Yugoslavia national team.

Managerial statistics

Honours

Player
Deportivo
Copa del Rey: 1994–95
Supercopa de España: 1995

Valencia
La Liga: 2001–02
Copa del Rey: 1998–99
Supercopa de España: 1999
UEFA Intertoto Cup: 1998
UEFA Champions League runner-up: 1999–2000, 2000–01

Manager
Serbia U21
UEFA European Under-21 Championship runner-up: 2007

Valladolid
Segunda División play-offs: 2012

Partizan
Serbian Cup: 2017–18

Individual
Serbian Coach of the Year: 2007

References

External links

Deportivo archives
CiberChe stats and bio 

1966 births
Living people
Sportspeople from Šabac
Yugoslav footballers
Serbia and Montenegro footballers
Serbian footballers
Association football defenders
FK Mačva Šabac players
FK Rad players
Deportivo de La Coruña players
Valencia CF players
CD Tenerife players
Yugoslav First League players
La Liga players
Segunda División players
Yugoslavia international footballers
Serbia and Montenegro international footballers
1998 FIFA World Cup players
UEFA Euro 2000 players
Serbian expatriate footballers
Serbia and Montenegro expatriate footballers
Serbian expatriate sportspeople in Spain
Serbia and Montenegro expatriate sportspeople in Spain
Expatriate footballers in Spain
Serbian football managers
Serbia national under-21 football team managers
FK Partizan managers
Serbia national football team managers
Royal Excel Mouscron managers
Hércules CF managers
Real Valladolid managers
Valencia CF managers
Córdoba CF managers
Al Shabab Al Arabi Club managers
Sporting de Gijón managers
Serbian SuperLiga managers
La Liga managers
Segunda División managers
UAE Pro League managers
Serbian expatriate football managers
Serbian expatriate sportspeople in Belgium
Serbian expatriate sportspeople in the United Arab Emirates
Expatriate football managers in Belgium
Expatriate football managers in Spain
Expatriate football managers in the United Arab Emirates